Danny Roberts  (born 14 July 1987)  is an English mixed martial artist who competes in the Welterweight division of the Ultimate Fighting Championship. A professional since 2010, he has also competed for Cage Warriors.

Background
Born in Croydon, London, Roberts grew up on a deprived estate with his mum and ten siblings before moving to Hartcliffe, Bristol at age 9. Unfortunately, things were only marginally better and Roberts who grew up without his father around and began to find himself drifting down the wrong path with the wrong people. After being expelled from seven different schools in London and Bristol, Roberts and his mother moved to Birkenhead where Roberts began boxing at age 16. He compiled a 3–1 pro record, before making his debut in mixed martial arts in 2010.

Mixed martial arts career

Early career
After going 1–1 as an amateur, he made his professional debut in December 2010. He competed for several regional promotions across Great Britain, including a stint in Cage Warriors.  He was able to compile a record of 11 - 1 before signing with the UFC on the heels of a first round finish of Jim Wallhead in September 2015.

Ultimate Fighting Championship 
Roberts was expected to make his promotional debut against Michael Graves on 10 December 2015 at UFC Fight Night 80. However, Graves was forced out of the bout with an injury and replaced by Nathan Coy. Roberts won the fight via technical submission in the first round.

Roberts next faced Dominique Steele on 23 April 2016 at UFC 197. He won the back-and-forth fight via unanimous decision. Both participants were awarded a Fight of the Night bonus.

Roberts faced Mike Perry on 8 October 2016 at UFC 204. He lost the back and forth fight via knockout in the third round.

Roberts faced Bobby Nash on 16 July 2017 at UFC Fight Night 113. He won the fight via knockout in the second round.

Roberts was expected to face Sheldon Westcott on 16 December 2017 at UFC on Fox 26. However, Westcott was removed from the card for undisclosed reasons in early December and was replaced by Nordine Taleb. Roberts lost the fight via knockout in the first round.

Roberts faced Oliver Enkamp on 17 March 2018 at UFC Fight Night 127. He won the fight via knockout in the first round.

Roberts was expected to face Alan Jouban on 22 July 2018 at UFC Fight Night 134. However, on 12 July, Jouban was pulled out from the fight, citing a neck injury. Jouban was replaced  David Zawada. He won the fight via split decision. This win earned him the Fight of the Night award.

Roberts faced Cláudio Silva on 16 March 2019 at UFC Fight Night 147. He lost the bout via an armbar submission in the third round.

Roberts faced promotional newcomer Michel Pereira on 18 May 2019 at UFC Fight Night 152. He lost the fight via knockout in the first round.

Roberts faced Zelim Imadaev on 9 November at UFC on ESPN+ 21. He won the fight via knockout in round two.

Roberts was scheduled to face Nicolas Dalby on 21 March 2020 at  UFC Fight Night: Woodley vs. Edwards.  Due to the COVID-19 pandemic, the event was eventually postponed . The bout with Dalby was rescheduled and was expected to take place on 25 July 2020 at UFC Fight Night: Whittaker vs. Till. However, Roberts was injured and he was replaced by Jesse Ronson.

Roberts was scheduled to face Tim Means on 19 June 2021 at UFC on ESPN 25 However, the pairing was scrapped by the promotion in the days leading up to the event for undisclosed reasons.

Roberts faced Ramazan Emeev on 16 October 2021 at UFC Fight Night 195. Roberts won the fight via controversial split decision. 10 out of 12 media outlets scored the bout as a win for Emeev.

Roberts faced Francisco Trinaldo on 7 May 2022 at UFC 274. He lost the bout via unanimous decision.

Roberts faced Jack Della Maddalena on November 19, 2022, at UFC Fight Night 215. He lost the fight via technical knockout in round one.

Championships and accomplishments
Ultimate Fighting Championship
Fight of the Night (Two times) vs. Dominique Steele and David Zawada

Mixed martial arts record

|-
|Loss
|align=center| 18–7
|Jack Della Maddalena
|TKO (punches)
|UFC Fight Night: Nzechukwu vs. Cuțelaba
|
|align=center|1
|align=center|3:24
|Las Vegas, Nevada, United States
|
|-
|Loss
|align=center| 18–6
|Francisco Trinaldo
|Decision (unanimous)
|UFC 274
|
|align=center|3
|align=center|5:00
|Phoenix, Arizona, United States
|
|-
|Win
|align=center| 18–5
|Ramazan Emeev
|Decision (split)
|UFC Fight Night: Ladd vs. Dumont
|
|align=center|3
|align=center|5:00
|Las Vegas, Nevada, United States
|
|-
|Win
|align=center|17–5
|Zelim Imadaev
|KO (punch)
|UFC Fight Night: Magomedsharipov vs. Kattar 
|
|align=center|2
|align=center|4:54
|Moscow, Russia
|
|-
|Loss
|align=center|16–5
|Michel Pereira
|KO (flying knee and punch)
|UFC Fight Night: dos Anjos vs. Lee 
|
|align=center|1
|align=center|1:47
|Rochester, New York, United States
|
|-
|Loss
|align=center|16–4
|Cláudio Silva
|Submission (armbar)
|UFC Fight Night: Till vs. Masvidal 
|
|align=center|3
|align=center|3:37
|London, England
|
|-
|Win
|align=center|16–3
|David Zawada
|Decision (split)
|UFC Fight Night: Shogun vs. Smith 
|
|align=center|3
|align=center|5:00
|Hamburg, Germany
|
|-
|Win
|align=center|15–3
|Oliver Enkamp
|KO (punch)
|UFC Fight Night: Werdum vs. Volkov 
|
|align=center|1
|align=center|2:12
|London, England
|
|- 
|Loss
|align=center|14–3
|Nordine Taleb
|KO (head kick and punch)
|UFC on Fox: Lawler vs. dos Anjos 
|
|align=center|1
|align=center|0:59
|Winnipeg, Manitoba, Canada
|
|-
|Win
|align=center|14–2
|Bobby Nash
|KO (punches)
|UFC Fight Night: Nelson vs. Ponzinibbio 
|
|align=center|2
|align=center|3:59
|Glasgow, Scotland
|
|-
|Loss
|align=center|13–2
|Mike Perry
|KO (knee and punches)
|UFC 204
|
|align=center|3
|align=center|4:40
|Manchester, England
|
|-
|Win
|align=center|13–1
|Dominique Steele
|Decision (unanimous)
|UFC 197
|
|align=center|3
|align=center|5:00
|Las Vegas, Nevada, United States
|
|-
|Win
|align=center|12–1
|Nathan Coy
|Technical Submission (triangle choke)
|UFC Fight Night: Namajunas vs. VanZant
|
|align=center|1
|align=center|2:46
|Las Vegas, Nevada, United States
|
|-
|Win
|align=center|11–1
|Jim Wallhead
|KO (punches)
|CWFC 68
|
|align=center|1
|align=center|4:49
|Liverpool, England
|
|-
|Win
|align=center|10–1
|Juan Manuel Suarez
|Decision (unanimous)
|CWFC 64
|
|align=center|3
|align=center|5:00
|Kentish Town, England
|
|-
|Win
|align=center|9–1
|Henry Fadipe
|Submission (rear-naked choke)
|CWFC 57
|
|align=center|3
|align=center|3:34
|Liverpool, England
|
|-
|Win
|align=center|8–1
|Diego Gonzalez
|TKO (knee and punches)
|CWFC 54
|
|align=center|2
|align=center|3:02
|Cardiff, Wales
|
|-
|Win
|align=center|7–1
|Jack Mason
|Submission (armbar)
|Cage Warriors: 48
|
|align=center|2
|align=center|2:46
|Kentish Town, England
|
|-
|Loss
|align=center|6–1
|Pavel Doroftei
|Submission (heel hook)
|UCC 10
|
|align=center|1
|align=center|1:21
|Manchester, England
|
|-
|Win
|align=center|6–0
|Shaun Lomas
|Decision (unanimous)
|UCC 10
|
|align=center|2
|align=center|5:00
|Manchester, England
|
|-
|Win
|align=center|5–0
|Shaun Lomas
|Submission (rear-naked choke)
|Cage Conflict 11
|
|align=center|1
|align=center|3:32
|Liverpool, England
|
|-
|Win
|align=center|4–0
|Aurelijus Kerpe
|Submission (D'Arce choke)
|Raw 1
|
|align=center|2
|align=center|2:43
|Liverpool, England
|
|-
|Win
|align=center|3–0
|David Howell
|TKO (knees)
|CWFC 43
|
|align=center|2
|align=center|2:26
|Kentish Town, England
|
|-
|Win
|align=center|2–0
|Matt Ross Francombe
|KO (knee and punches)
|OMMAC 9
|
|align=center|2
|align=center|1:27
|Liverpool, England
|
|-
|Win
|align=center|1–0
|Darius Kuncevicius
|TKO (knees)
|OMMAC 8
|
|align=center|1
|align=center|0:47
|Liverpool, England
|
|-
|}

See also
 List of current UFC fighters
 List of male mixed martial artists

References

External links
 
 

1987 births
Sportspeople from London
Welterweight mixed martial artists
Mixed martial artists utilizing boxing
Living people
English male mixed martial artists
Ultimate Fighting Championship male fighters
English male boxers